The 2019–20 Shakhtar Donetsk season was the club's 29th season.

Season events
On 11 June, Paulo Fonseca and his coaching staff left Shakhtar Donetsk to join A.S. Roma, with Luís Castro being appointed as Fonseca's replacement the following day.

Due to the COVID-19 pandemic in Ukraine, and based on resolutions of the Cabinet of Ukraine and the UAF Executive Committee, on 11 March the Ukrainian Premier League decided all games where to be played behind closed doors until 3 April 2020. Six days later, on 17 March, the Ukrainian Association of Football announced that all football in the country would be suspended from 18 March for the foreseeable future because of the COVID-19 pandemic.

Squad

On loan

Other players under the contract

U21 team squad

Transfers

In

Out

Loans out

Released

Friendlies

Competitions

Goalscorers

Clean sheets

Disciplinary record

References

External links 
Official website

Shakhtar Donetsk
FC Shakhtar Donetsk seasons
Shakhtar Donetsk
Ukrainian football championship-winning seasons